James Govan (1949-2014) was an American musician.

James Govan may also refer to:

James Govan (cricketer) (born 1966), Scottish cricketer
James Govan (architect) of Ontario Shores Centre for Mental Health Sciences